Munawwaruz Zaman (2 April 1951 – 28 July 1994) was one of the players of the Pakistan national field hockey team produced by Pakistan. Munawwar played for Pakistan until his retirement in 1980. He was also a high-ranking bank officer. He died in 1994 of a cardiac arrest during a break while practicing with the Pakistan hockey team for veterans Hockey World Cup.

Playing career
He began his career in 1971 when he was 19 years old. When Tanvir Dar was injured midway through the semifinals, Munawwar had his first ever shot at penalty corner in an international match. He became an instant hero and household name in Pakistan by scoring the match winning goal against Pakistan's traditional rival, India.

During his career Pakistan won the Olympic silver medal in 1972 and the bronze medal in 1976. He led Pakistan to a magnificent victory in the 2nd Champions Trophy in 1980 at Karachi and Kuala Lumpur Quadrangular Gold.

During his career, he scored a total of 44 goals in 119 matches. In the 1970s, Manzoor ul Hasan and Munawwar uz Zaman were considered the greatest pair of full backs in field hockey. In the early 1990s,  Munawwar started working with the Pakistan team as a coach.

Played for Pakistan and Habib Bank Limited in Pakistan a total of 111 International Matches including the following:

Olympics: 1972, 1976
World Cups: 1971, 1975, 1978
Asian Games: 1974, 1978
Champion Trophies: 1978, 1980

In 1997, the Pakistan government awarded Munawwar uz Zaman a posthumous Pride of Performance award for his services to the country.

References

External links
 

1951 births
1994 deaths
Pakistani male field hockey players
Olympic field hockey players of Pakistan
Olympic silver medalists for Pakistan
Olympic bronze medalists for Pakistan
Medalists at the 1972 Summer Olympics
Medalists at the 1976 Summer Olympics
Field hockey players at the 1972 Summer Olympics
Field hockey players at the 1976 Summer Olympics
Asian Games medalists in field hockey
Field hockey players at the 1974 Asian Games
Field hockey players at the 1978 Asian Games
Asian Games gold medalists for Pakistan
Medalists at the 1974 Asian Games
Medalists at the 1978 Asian Games
Recipients of the Pride of Performance
1978 Men's Hockey World Cup players
Olympic medalists in field hockey